San Pablo (Spanish for Saint Paul) may refer to:

Places

Argentina 
 San Pablo (Catamarca)
 San Pablo, San Luis

Belize 
 San Pablo, Orange Walk

Bolivia 
 San Pablo de Lípez, Sud Lípez Province

Brazil 
 São Paulo, the capital of São Paulo state, and the country's largest city
 São Paulo State

Chile 
 San Pablo, Chile
 San Pablo (volcano)

Colombia 
 San Pablo, Bolívar
 San Pablo, Nariño
 San Pablo de Borbur

Costa Rica 
San Pablo (canton), Heredia

Cuba 
San Pablo, a barrio in Consolación del Sur

El Salvador 
San Pablo Tacachico, La Libertad

Ecuador 
San Pablo River (Ecuador)

Guatemala 
San Pablo, San Marcos
San Pablo Jocopilas, Suchitepéquez
San Pablo La Laguna, Sololá

Mexico 
San Pablo Balleza, Chihuahua
San Pablo de las Salinas, México State
San Pablo Guelatao, Oaxaca
San Pablo Villa de Mitla, Oaxaca

Panama 
San Pablo River (Panama)

Paraguay 
San Pablo District, Paraguay
San Pablo (Asunción)

Peru 
San Pablo, Cajamarca, San Pablo in the Cajamarca region
San Pablo, Loreto, San Pablo in Loreto region
San Pablo District, Bellavista
San Pablo District, Canchis
San Pablo District, Mariscal Ramón Castilla
San Pablo District, San Pablo

Philippines 
San Pablo, Isabela
San Pablo, Laguna
San Pablo, Zamboanga del Sur

Spain 
San Pablo (Zaragoza), a church
San Pablo de la Moraleja, Valladolid
San Pablo Airport, Seville, Spain

United States 
San Pablo, California
San Pablo, Colorado
San Pablo, New Mexico
San Pablo Bay, California
Pilot Knob (Imperial County, California)

Other uses 
 , a ship of the United States Navy
 USS San Pablo, a fictional ship in the 1962 novel The Sand Pebbles
 San Pablo metro station, a metro station in Santiago, Chile
 San Pablo station (PNR), operated by the Philippine National Railways in Laguna Province
 San Pablo (Mexico City Metrobús), a BRT station in Mexico City
 San Pablo (Mexibús), a BRT station in Chimalhuacán, Mexico

See also 
 San Pablo River (disambiguation)
 Saint Paul (disambiguation)
 San Paolo (disambiguation)
 Sant Pau (disambiguation)
 São Paulo (disambiguation)